A total lunar eclipse took place on Thursday, April 2, 1931, not visible in Washington.

Visibility

Related lunar eclipses

Saros series

See also
List of lunar eclipses
List of 20th-century lunar eclipses

References

External links

1931-04
1931 in science
Central total lunar eclipses